The Deadly Battle at Hicksville is a 1914 American silent short comedy film directed by Marshall Neilan and starring John E. Brennan, Ruth Roland, and Lloyd Hamilton. The film was released by General Film Company on July 31, 1914.

Plot

Cast
John E. Brennan as Jim
Ruth Roland as Dolly - a Southern Belle
Lloyd Hamilton as Dick - Jim's Rival

See also
List of American films of 1914

References

External links

1914 comedy films
Silent American comedy films
1914 films
American black-and-white films
American silent short films
Kalem Company films
1910s American films